This is a list of encyclopedias and encyclopedic/biographical dictionaries published on the subject of astronomy and astronomers in any language. Entries are in the English language except where noted.

A
Amils, Ricardo; Quintanilla, José Cernicharo; Cleaves, Henderson James (1 June 2011). Encyclopedia of Astrobiology. Springer. .
Angelo, Joseph A. (1 January 2009). Encyclopedia of Space and Astronomy. Infobase Publishing. .
Angelo, Joseph A. Encyclopedia of space exploration. Facts on File, 2000. .
Angelo, Joseph A. The Extraterrestrial Encyclopedia: Our Search for Life in Outer Space. Facts on File, rev. ed., 1991. 
Angelo, Joseph A., Jr., Facts on File. The Facts on File space and astronomy handbook. Facts on File, 2002. .
Asimov, Isaac. Isaac Asimov's Library of the Universe. Gareth Stevens, 1988.

B
Baker, David. Larousse Guide to Astronomy. Larousse, 1978.
Bakich, Michael E. (10 July 2003). The Cambridge Encyclopedia of Amateur Astronomy. Cambridge University Press. .

C
Cambridge Encyclopedia of Astronomy. Crown, 1977.
Clapham, Frances M.; Taylor, Ron B. (1982). Rand McNally astronomy encyclopedia. Children's Press. .

D
Daintith, John; Gould, William (September 2006). Collins Dictionary of Astronomy. Collins. .
Daintith, John; Gould, William; Illingworth, Valerie (1 January 2009). The Facts on File Dictionary of Astronomy. Infobase Publishing. .

E
Encyclopedia of astronomy and astrophysics. Taylor & Francis. .

G
Gatland, Kenneth. Illustrated Encyclopedia of Space Technology. Crown, 2nd ed., 1990.
Gore, John Ellard (September 2010). An Astronomical Glossary: Or Dictionary of Terms Used in Astronomy (1893). Kessinger Publishing. .

H
Handbuch der Physik. Springer-Verlag, 1956–1988. ISSN 0085-140X.
Hetherington, Norriss S. Encyclopedia of Cosmology: Historical, Philosophical, and Scientific Foundations of Modern Cosmology. Garland, 1993.
Hockey, Thomas A., Virginia Trimble, Thomas R. Williams, Katherine Bracher, eds. Biographical Encyclopedia of Astronomers. Springer, 2007. .
Hutton, Charles (1817). An astronomical dictionary: compiled from Hutton's Mathematical and philosophical dictionary: to which is prefixed an introduction containing a brief history of astronomy, and a familiar illustration of its elementary principles. Published and sold by Hezekiah Howe.

I
Illingworth, Valerie, John Owen, Edward Clark, Facts on File. The Facts on File dictionary of astronomy. Facts on File, 2000. .
Ince, Martin (2001). Dictionary of Astronomy. Peter Collin Publishing. .

K
Kitchin, Christopher R. (2002). Illustrated Dictionary of Practical Astronomy. Springer. .

L
Lang, Kenneth R. (19 June 2006). A Companion to Astronomy and Astrophysics: Chronology and Glossary with Data Tables. Springer. .
Lewis, Richard. Illustrated Encyclopedia of the Universe. Crown, 1983.
Lusis, Andy. Astronomy and astronautics: An enthusiast's guide to books and periodicals. Facts on File, 1986. .

M
Maran, Stephen P. The Astronomy and astrophysics encyclopedia. Van Nostrand Reinhold, 1992. . 
Maran, Stephen P. (15 October 1991). The Astronomy and Astrophysics Encyclopedia. John Wiley & Sons. .
Mark, Hans. Encyclopedia of space science and technology. Wiley, 2003. .
Matzner, Richard A. Dictionary of geophysics, astrophysics, and astronomy. CRC Press, 2001. .
Meyers, Robert Allen (1989). Encyclopedia of Astronomy and Astrophysics. Academic Press.
Meyers, Robert A., ed. Encyclopedia of Physical Science and Technology., 2nd ed., Academic Press, 1992.
Mitton, Jacqueline (1998). The Penguin Dictionary of Astronomy. Penguin Books. .
Mitton, Jacqueline (29 January 2001). Cambridge Dictionary of Astronomy. Cambridge University Press. .
Moore, Patrick (15 August 2002). Astronomy Encyclopedia. Oxford University Press. .
Moore, Patrick. The International Encyclopedia of Astronomy. Crown, 1987. 
Moore, Patrick. Patrick Moore's A-Z of Astronomy. Norton, rev. ed., 1987. 
Muller, Paul (1968). Concise Encyclopedia of Astronomy. Collins.
Murdin, Paul. Encyclopedia of astronomy and astrophysics. Institute of Physics Publ.; Nature Publ. Group, 2001. .  
Murdin, Paul; Penston, Margaret (30 September 2004). The Firefly Encyclopedia Of Astronomy. Firefly Books. .
Murdin, Paul; Penston, Margaret (1 September 2004). The Canopus Encyclopedia of Astronomy. Canopus. .

P
Parker, Sybil, ed. McGraw-Hill Encyclopedia of Science and Technology. 7th ed., McGraw-Hill, 1992. 
Parker, Sybil P. and Jay M. Pasachoff(1993). McGraw-Hill encyclopedia of astronomy. McGraw-Hill. .
Porter, Roy, Marilyn Bailey Ogilvie. The biographical dictionary of scientists. Oxford University Press, 2000. .

R
Ramamurthy, G. (2005). Biographical Dictionary Of Great Astronomers. Sura Books. .
Ridpath, Ian (1 March 2012). A Dictionary of Astronomy. Oxford University Press. .
Ridpath, Ian. The illustrated encyclopedia of the universe. Watson-Guptill Publications, 2001. .
Ridpath, Ian (1 January 1980). The Illustrated Encyclopedia of Astronomy and Space. Crowell. .
Ridpath, Ian; Woodruff, John (13 September 1996). Cambridge Astronomy Dictionary. Cambridge University Press. .
Ronan, Colin A. (1979). Encyclopedia of astronomy: a comprehensive survey of our solar system, galaxy and beyond. Hamlyn. .
Room, Adrian. Dictionary of astronomical names. Routledge, 1988. .
Rudaux, Lucien; Vaucouleurs, Gérard Henri de (1959). Larousse Encyclopedia of Astronomy. Prometheus Press.
Rycroft, Michael. The Cambridge Encyclopedia of Space. Cambridge, 1990.

S
Sachs, Margaret. UFO Encyclopedia. Putnam, 1981.
Satterthwaite, Gilbert Elliott (1 January 1970). Encyclopedia of Astronomy. Hamlyn.
Schweighauser, Charles A. Astronomy from A to Z: A Dictionary of Celestial Objects and Ideas. Sangamon State University, 1991.
Spitz, Armand; Gaynor, Frank (1959). Dictionary of Astronomy and Astronautics. Philosophical Library.
Stewart, John. Moons of the Solar System: An Illustrated Encyclopedia. McFarland, 1991. 
Story, Ronald. Encyclopedia of UFOs. Doubleday, 1980.

T
Trimble, Virginia; Williams, Thomas; Bracher, Katherine (20 November 2007). Biographical Encyclopedia of Astronomers. Springer. .

W
Weigert, Alfred; Zimmermann, Helmut (1968). A Concise Encyclopedia of Astronomy. American Elsevier Pub. Co.
Welch, Rosanne. Encyclopedia of women in aviation and space. ABC-CLIO, 1998. .
Woodruff, John (1 October 2003). Firefly Astronomy Dictionary. Firefly Books. .

Y
Yenne, Bill. Encyclopedia of U.S. Spacecraft. Exeter Books, 1985.

See also 
 Bibliography of encyclopedias

Citations

References 
Guide to Reference.  American Library Association. Retrieved 5 December 2014. (subscription required).
Kister, Kenneth F. (1994). Kister's Best Encyclopedias (2nd ed.). Phoenix: Oryx. .

Astronomy
Astronomy books